Ivan Kuzmin (born 25 April 1962) is a Russian ski-orienteering competitor and world champion. He received a gold medal in the short distance at the 1994 World Ski Orienteering Championships in Val di Non, shared with Nicolo Corradini.

References

1962 births
Living people
Russian orienteers
Male orienteers
Ski-orienteers
20th-century Russian people